Nicolas Lopez (born 14 November 1980 in Tarbes) is a French sabre fencer.

Lopez won the gold medal in the sabre team event at the 2006 World Fencing Championships after beating Ukraine in the final. He accomplished this with his teammates Vincent Anstett, Julien Pillet and Boris Sanson.

At the 2008 Beijing Olympics he helped his team win a gold medal in fencing, after beating the United States in the final. Lopez also won the silver medal in the individual sabre fencing, losing to Zhong Man in the final.

Achievements
 2005 World Fencing Championships, team sabre
 2006 World Fencing Championships, team sabre
 2007 World Fencing Championships, team sabre
 2008 Beijing Olympics, team sabre
 2008 Beijing Olympics, individual sabre

References

External links
 Profile at the European Fencing Confederation

1980 births
Living people
Sportspeople from Tarbes
French male sabre fencers
Fencers at the 2008 Summer Olympics
Olympic fencers of France
Olympic silver medalists for France
Olympic gold medalists for France
Medalists at the 2008 Summer Olympics
Olympic medalists in fencing